Alan Anthony Dupont  is an Australian international security expert, Defence and National Security Advocate for the Northern Territory and company director who has been the CEO of geopolitical risk consultancy the Cognoscenti Group since 2016. He is also contributing national security editor for The Australian newspaper, adjunct professor at the University of New South Wales (UNSW), a non-resident senior fellow at the Atlantic Council in Washington, and the Lowy Institute in Sydney and a fellow at the Hinrich Foundation.

Dupont is a former army officer, intelligence analyst, freelance journalist, diplomat, academic and well-known commentator on defence and national security issues.

Education and early career 
Dupont was born in London, England, and emigrated to Australia in 1957. He attended Aquinas College in Melbourne and the Royal Military College, Duntroon, graduating in 1971. He earned a Bachelor of Arts from the University of NSW and a Master of Arts Degree (Hons) and PhD in International Relations from the Australian National University.

He served with the Fourth Battalion, Royal Australian Regiment, later working as a strategic analyst at the Joint Intelligence Organisation (Australia) in Canberra and, after resigning from the Army, as a free-lance journalist in South America. In 1980, he joined the Department of Foreign Affairs and Trade (Australia) and served in the Australian Embassies in the Republic of Korea South Korea (1984–1987) and Indonesia (1991–1994), the latter as Counsellor. During his time in Korea he studied at the US Foreign Service Institute, graduating in 1985.

Academic career 
In 1995 Dupont took up an academic position at the Australian National University as Fellow, and later Senior Fellow, in the Strategic and Defence Studies Centre, Research School of Pacific and Asian Studies. In those capacities, he published widely and became a regular media commentator on Australian defence, foreign policy and East Asian security issues. He became a leading authority in the emerging field of transnational security studies, publishing a pathbreaking book by Cambridge University Press in 2001: “East Asia Imperilled: Transnational Security Challenges.”

From 2003–2006, he was Senior Fellow and Director of the International Security Program at the Lowy Institute for International Policy in Sydney where he gained international prominence for his work on traditional and new security challenges to the security of the Asia-Pacific region, particularly the strategic implications of climate change, food, water and energy insecurity, pandemics and unregulated population movements. He was an Industry Linkage Fellow with the Australian Research Council from 2004–2006.

In 2006, Dupont was appointed as the inaugural Michael Hintze Chair of International Security at the University of Sydney and the first Director of the Centre for International Security Studies. He was later appointed the start-up CEO of the United States Studies Centre, a million teaching and research collaboration between the University of Sydney, the American Australian Association and the Commonwealth and NSW governments. From 2012–2016, Dupont held joint professorial appointments in the Faculty of Arts and Social Sciences and the Business School at the University of New South Wales, before leaving the university to establish the Cognoscenti Group.

Business and advisory career 
Dupont has held several company directorships from 1995 to the present, including Director of the United States Studies Centre and Dupont Consulting.

He was an Australian representative on the ASEAN Regional Forum (ARF) Register of Experts and Eminent Persons (2002–2016), and served as a Counsellor of the Australian Strategic Policy Institute (2003–2009),  and on the boards of the Land Warfare Centre (Australia) (2005–2010); CQS, a leading European asset manager (2006–2014); the Sydney Globalist (2007–2012); University of Sydney Board of Examiners (2008-09); the Australian Army Journal (2010–2012); Outcomes Australia (2011–2012); and the Northern Territory Strategic Defence Advisory Board (2015–2020).

He was special foreign policy advisor to Nobel Laureate and former President of East Timor, José Ramos-Horta (2001–2006), and has advised several Australian defence and foreign ministers including the former Minister for Defence (Australia), David Johnston (Politician), as ministerial advisor (2013–2014). He led the Abbott Government’s Defence White Paper team (2013–2014)  and was a member of the Foreign Affairs Council (2003–2007) and the Defence and National Security Advisory Council (2006–2007).

Honours and appointments 
Dupont received a commendation from East Timor’s Foreign Minister, José Ramos-Horta, in 2001 and a commendation for his analysis and advisory work from Japan’s Foreign Minister, Tarō Asō, in 2005.

Dupont was appointed an Officer of the Order of Australia (AO) in the 2019 Queen's Birthday Honours for "distinguished service to the international community through security analysis and strategic policy development".

On 9 November 2020 Dupont was appointed as an Advisory Councillor to the Asia Society Australia. The Society's main aim is to prepare Australian leaders and community for a deeper and sustained engagement with Asia.

On 16 November 2020 Dupont was appointed the new Northern Territory Defence and National Security Advocate. His main role will be to advocate for the Territory and make sure Northern Territory businesses are well positioned to capitalise on the billion defence equipment and capabilities spend over the next ten years.

Publications 

 
 "China sets out a snare for the worldwide web", The Weekend Australian, 16 May 2020
 "Defence needs smaller, cheaper, more agile weapons", The Australian, 12 November 2019
 "On Brink of Cold War 2.0", The Weekend Australian, 8 June 2019
 "The global race for space", The Weekend Australian, 15 September 2018
 "Voters have had it with uncontrolled migration", The Australian, 27 June 2018
 "The Autocrats Club", The Weekend Australian, 10 February 2018
 "Islamist eruption highlights regional risks", The Weekend Australian, 17 June 2017
 "Korea's Kim Baits Trump With Missiles", The Weekend Australian, 18 February 2017
 
 "Bumpy ride: Donald Trump to usher in a new world order", The Australian, 2016

 "Pax Americana to give way to a new world order", The Australian, 2014
 
 "Time to attack cyber crime with a strong security policy", The Sydney Morning Herald, 13 October 2010
 "Oiling the wheels of energy management", Australian Financial Review, 16 December 2009

 
 Unsheathing the Samurai Sword: Japan's Changing Security Policy", Lowy Institute Paper 003, November 2004, pp.1-85
 Alan Dupont, "Transnational Security" in Strategy and Security in the Asia Pacific, ed. R. Ayson and D. Ball, (Crows Nest: Allen and Unwin, 2006), pp. 103–20
 Alan Dupont and Graeme Pearman, Heating up the Planet: Climate Change and Security (Lowy Institute Paper 12, 2006)
 Asia enters a new security era", International Herald Tribune, 5 June 2003
 
 Alan Dupont, East Asia Imperilled: Transnational Challenges to Security (Cambridge: Cambridge University Press, 2001)
 "There's a catch to world security", The Bangkok Post, 30 June 1999
 "Shielded by Intelligence", The Age, 24 April 1999
 "After Suharto, Who? The Answer Is Far From Obvious", International Herald Tribune, 19 February 1998
 "Wars Over Water?", The Straits Times, 28 May,1997

References

External links 
 Alan Dupont Cognoscenti Group

Royal Military College, Duntroon graduates
Academic staff of the University of Sydney
Living people
International relations scholars
Officers of the Order of Australia
1950 births